William Dillard (July 20, 1911 – January 16, 1995) was an American jazz trumpeter, actor, and singer.

Background 
Dillard was born in Philadelphia, Pennsylvania, and played in bands led by Jelly Roll Morton, Benny Carter, Luis Russell and Teddy Hill, among others. He also had an acting career on Broadway, including in One Mo' Time.

Discography
With Dizzy Gillespie
The Complete RCA Victor Recordings (Bluebird, 1937–1949, [1995])
With Earle Warren
Earle Warren (RCA, 1974)

Filmography

Film

Television

References

External links

 

American jazz trumpeters
American male trumpeters
American jazz singers
Swing trumpeters
1911 births
1995 deaths
20th-century American male actors
20th-century American singers
20th-century trumpeters
20th-century American male musicians
American male jazz musicians